Chocolate hero may refer to:

 Waheed Murad, a Pakistani film actor during the 1960s - 1980s.
 R. Madhavan, an Indian Tamil film actor.